Fullerton College (FC) is a public community college in Fullerton, California. The college is part of the California Community Colleges System and the North Orange County Community College District. Established in 1913, it is the oldest community college in continuous operation in California.

History

In April 1913, the governing board of Fullerton Union High School approved a motion to establish a two-year postgraduate course of study at the high school. At this time, Fullerton was primarily an agricultural community, which specialized in the production of citrus produce. Delbert Brunton, who was the Fullerton High principal, established the new Fullerton Junior College to provide such postgraduate study.

Twenty-six freshman students enrolled in the first year, and the school had a curriculum of 10 courses. "In 1922 the college was reorganized as an independent junior college district. After holding classes on the Fullerton Union High School campus for its first 23 years, the college began moving to its own fourteen-acre campus next door in 1936."

In 2002, North Orange County voters passed a $239 million facilities bond measure, of which nearly $135 million was allotted to Fullerton College. It was used for renovation of current campus facilities and also to construct new facilities. On June 13, 2005, the new library inside of the LLRC was opened, and a formal dedication occurred on October 28, 2005. A bond measure that passed in 2014 will award the North Orange County Community College District (NOCCCD) $574 million to fund construction and renovation projects for the next 25 years.

In 2021, the college introduced an American Indian and Indigenous Studies degree program. This was announced with the school's celebration of Indigenous People's Day.

Campus 
The college is located in the city of Fullerton, California, in northern Orange County. The campus is within walking distance of the downtown section.

The Fullerton College library first opened in 1913, in a small section of the Fullerton High School Library. It moved into the high school gymnasium in 1929 and to a small space in the new science building in 1938. A specialized facility was constructed in 1957 and named the William T. Boyce Library in 1962 in honor of William T. Boyce, who served as dean and president from 1918 to 1951. A new library was constructed and opened on June 13, 2005, and formally dedicated on October 28, 2005.

Artist-in-residence program
The Fullerton College Art Department hosts a yearly artist-in-residence (AIR) program which was started in 1972 with a visit from painter Wayne Thiebaud. August 2013 marked the 100th fall semester of the AIR program. It was celebrated with the first exhibit of the entire AIR art collection at the Fullerton College Art Gallery.

Student life 

The students of Fullerton College have established a student body association named Associated Students of Fullerton College. The association is required by law to "encourage students to participate in the governance of the college".

Associated Students of Fullerton College is a voting member of a statewide community college student organization named Student Senate for California Community Colleges. The statewide Student Senate is authorized by law "to advocate before the Legislature and other state and local governmental entities".

Notable alumni

Actors and artists 
 Bill Blackbeard — Writer
 James Cameron — Academy Award Winning movie director and screenwriter, and an explorer of the seas. Attended Fullerton College from 1973 to 1974. 
 William Conrad — Actor, producer and director whose career spanned five decades in radio (Gunsmoke), film (The Killers) and television (Cannon). 
 Jerome Ranft — Sculptor
 Cress Williams — Actor, appeared in numerous TV shows including Beverly Hills, 90210, Star Trek: Deep Space Nine, NYPD Blue, ER, Becker, Nash Bridges, Providence
 Renee Griffin — Actress
 Steven Seagal — Actor and martial artist
 Matthew Lillard — Actor
 Eden Espinosa — Actress and singer
 Mitch Pileggi — Actor
 Jason Scott Lee — Actor
 Florence Arnold — Painter
 Ruby Berkley Goodwin — Actress
 Nathan Baesel — Actor
 Harry Anderson — Actor, comedian, and magician

Music 
 Gwen Stefani — Lead singer of band No Doubt and fashion designer
 Bobby Hatfield — Singer and member of The Righteous Brothers
 Scheila Gonzalez — Grammy winning multi-instrumentalist
 Jack Cooper — Composer, arranger, instrumentalist
 Dan Radlauer — Composer
 Leo Fender — Founder of the Fender Electric Instrument Manufacturing Company
 Mark D. Sanders — Songwriter
 Tim Buckley — Singer-songwriter
 Kye Palmer — Trumpet player, The Tonight Show Band

Politics 
 Pat Nixon — Wife of former President Richard M. Nixon and First Lady of the United States from 1969 to 1974
 Cristian Terheș — Member of the European Parliament for Romania
 Mike Wilson — Member of the Kentucky Senate
 Sharon Quirk-Silva — Member of the California State Assembly
 Cruz Reynoso — Former associate justice of the Supreme Court of California from 1982–1987

Sports 
 Justin Carter — Basketball player for Maccabi Kiryat Gat of the Israeli Premier League
 Bobby Cramer — MLB pitcher
 Jim Fassel — NFL and UFL coach, started as a quarterback at Fullerton and later returned to coach the Fullerton football team in 1973.
 Lynn Hill — Climber
 Kevin McLain — Former American football linebacker in the NFL, played for the Los Angeles Rams
 Monte Nitzkowski — Swimmer and water polo player.
 Steve DeBerg — Former NFL quarterback
 Dave Wilson — Former NFL quarterback
 Brian Noble — Former NFL linebacker
 John Pease — Former NFL and college coach
 Mike Horan — Former NFL kicker
 J. C. Pearson — Former NFL player
 Floyd Rhea — Former NFL player
 Brig Owens — Former NFL player
 Howie Livingston — Former NFL player
 Larry Mac Duff — Former NFL and college coach
 Bill Bathe — Former MLB catcher
 John Young — Former MLB player
 Steve Kiefer — Former MLB player
 Dan Stevens — Former MLB player
 Al Hrabosky — Former MLB pitcher
 Steve Trachsel — Former MLB pitcher
 Ron Johnson — Former MLB player and minor league manager
 Robert Frojen — Water polo player, 1956 Olympic team
 Marvin Burns — Water polo player, 1952 and 1960 Olympic teams
 Bill Johnson — Olympic swimmer on the 1968 800m freestyle relay team
 Bob Horn — Water polo goalie, 1956 and 1960 Olympic teams
 Jerry Pimm — College basketball player and head coach
 Bobby Dye — College basketball player and head coach
 Sharron Backus — College softball player and head coach
 Rick Sloan — Track & field Decathlete 1968 Olympics
 Doug Nordquist — Track & field high jumper 1984 Olympics

References

External links

 Official website

 
California Community Colleges
Education in Fullerton, California
Educational institutions established in 1913
Schools accredited by the Western Association of Schools and Colleges
Universities and colleges in Orange County, California
1913 establishments in California
Two-year colleges in the United States